Patli Dar (also Romanized as Patlī Dar, Patlīdar, and Potlīdar; also known as Patliyār) is a village in Zhavarud-e Sharqi Rural District, in the Central District of Sanandaj County, Kurdistan Province, Iran. At the 2006 census, its population was 62, in 17 families. The village is populated by Kurds.

References 

Towns and villages in Sanandaj County
Kurdish settlements in Kurdistan Province